Schairer is a German surname primarily from the Baden-Württemberg region.  It stems from the German word "Scheuer," or barn, in the Swabian dialect. It also may refer to:

 Erich Schairer, a journalist
 Erich Schairer Prize, an award for journalism
 Eberhard Schairer, a scientist who demonstrated smoking's links to lung cancer in 1943
 Heinrich Schairer & Co., an electronics corporation
 John Frank Schairer (1904–1970), an American geochemist

References

 Erich Schairer Webpage. 
 Heinrich Schairer & Co.
  Atlas der Familienname Baden-Wuerttemberg